The following is a List of tribal councils in British Columbia. Treaty Council organizations are not listed.

List of tribal councils 

Defunct:

Fraser Canyon Indian Administration (Nlaka'pamux)
In-SHUCK-ch Nation
Tsimshian Tribal Council

Other organizations 
The following are groups that are not technically tribal councils but are organizations of traditional governments, or representing traditional governance.

Office of the Hereditary Chiefs of the Gitxsan
Office of the Hereditary Chiefs of the Wet'suwet'en, referred to by the BC government as "Office of the Wet'suwet'en"
Tahltan Nation, governed by Tahltan Central Council

The first two organizations are allied and often release joint documents with the name Office of the Hereditary Chiefs of the Gitxsan and Wet'suwet'en.

See also

First Nations in British Columbia
Status of First Nations treaties in British Columbia

References

External links 
Aboriginal Canada Information Network: BC Tribal Council Listings